France competed at the 2012 Summer Paralympics in London, United Kingdom, from 29 August to 9 September 2012.

Medalists

Archery

Men

|-
|align=left|Maurice Champey
|align=left rowspan=2|Men's individual compound
|653
|11
|L 1-7
|colspan=5|Did not advance
|-
|align=left|Franck Haudoin
|630
|22
|W 7-1
|L 2-6
|colspan=4|Did not advance
|-
|align=left|Alexandre Lasvenes
|align=left rowspan=2|Men's individual recurve standing
|613
|7
|
|L 3-7
|colspan=4|Did not advance
|-
|align=left|Joel Perrot
|614
|6
|
|L 5-6
|colspan=4|Did not advance
|}

Women

|-
|align=left|Brigitte Duboc
|align=left|Women's individual recurve standing
|470
|17
|W 6-2
|L 0-6
|colspan=4|Did not advance
|}

Athletics

Men's track

Men's field

Women's track

Women's field

Cycling

Men's road

Men's track

Women's road

Equestrian

Individual

Team

* Indicates that score counts in team total

Football 5-a-side

France has qualified for the football 5-a-side tournament.

Group play

Semi-finals

Gold medal match

Judo

Men

Women

Powerlifting

Men

Rowing

Sailing

* Due to a lack of wind Race 11 was cancelled

Shooting

Swimming

Men

Women

Table tennis

The French table tennis competitors failed to win a gold medal in men's, women's and teams' events for the first time since 1980: they won two silvers and three bronze medals. However, they had the second most players compete since 2004.
Men

Women

Teams

Wheelchair basketball

Men's tournament

France qualified for the men's team event in wheelchair basketball by finishing second at the 2010 Wheelchair Basketball World Championship. Competing athletes are given an eight-level-score specific to wheelchair basketball, ranging from 0.5 to 4.5 with lower scores representing a higher degree of disability. The sum score of all players on the court cannot exceed 14.

Group B

9th/10th place match

Wheelchair fencing

Wheelchair rugby

Group A

5th–8th place semi-finals

7th/8th place match

Wheelchair tennis

See also
France at the Paralympics
France at the 2012 Summer Olympics

Notes

Nations at the 2012 Summer Paralympics
2012
Paralympics